Bufothionine is a sulfur-containing compound which is present in the bufotoxins secreted by the parotoid gland of certain toads of the genera Bufo and Chaunus. This specific compound can be found in the skin of certain species of toad such as the Asiatic Toad, Chaunus arunco, Chaunus crucifer, Chaunus spinulosus, and Chaunus arenarum.

Research 
In ancient times, cinobufacini, which is extracted from the skin and the parotid venom glands of toad of the bufo genus was used to treat symptoms like swelling and pain. In the present time, cinobufacinin injections are used to achieve satisfactory effect on Hepatocellular carcinoma (HCC) in China. Bufothionine is a major active component of cinobufacini. Bufothionine has been shown to suppress growth of cancerous liver cells in vitro . In vivo, bufothionine has also been showing relieved symptoms and anti inflammatory activities in tumor bearing mice. Experiments were conducted in which cultured cancer cells were shown to have an increase in G2-M damage checkpoint, ensuring that growth of the cell will not continue until the damage to the DNA is corrected while also showing a drop in the G0 and G1 activity, which pertains to phase where there is cell growth and RNA production.  

Bufothionine is shown to induce autophagy in hepatocellular carcinomas by inhibiting JAK2/STAT3 pathways, which may present possibilities of anti cancer mechanism in bufothionine through cinobufacini injections. Similarly, bufothionine has also been shown to increase the chances of cell death and decrease cell growth of gastric cancer related cells by inhibiting the PIM3 gene, which, in cancerous cells, increases the resistance of chemotherapeutic treatments. In glioblastoma multiforme (GBM), bufothionine presents anti-tumor activities in the GBM cells lines U87 and U373 by triggering endoplasmic reticulum stress to lead cell death in the U87 and U373 cells.

References

Vertebrate toxins
Quaternary ammonium compounds
Quinoline alkaloids
Tryptamine alkaloids
Organosulfites
Heterocyclic compounds with 3 rings